Piplia Mandi is a town and a Nagar Parishad in Mandsaur district in the Indian state of Madhya Pradesh. It is15 km away from the city of Mandsaur on state highway 31.

Demographics 
 India census, Piplia Mandi had a population of 16,703.  Males constitute 51% of the population and females 49%. Piplia Mandi has an average literacy rate of 70%, higher than the national average of 59.5%: male literacy is 78%, and female literacy is 61%. In Piplia Mandi, 15% of the population is under 6 years of age.

Transport

References 

Cities and towns in Mandsaur district